Pseudophoxinus libani, also known as the Levantine minnow, is a species of ray-finned fish in the family Cyprinidae. It is the only endemic fish of Lebanon.

It was originally reported in the upper Orontes river by Louis Charles Émile Lortet in 1883. It was considered extinct in 1996 but was found again in 2001, alive and well, swimming around in Lake Yammoune in the Yammoune nature reserve near Yammoune village. Its natural habitats are rivers and inland karsts.) It is potentially affected by overfishing. The Orontes minnow is sometimes considered conspecific by some taxonomic authorities.

References

Pseudophoxinus
Taxa named by Louis Charles Émile Lortet
Fish described in 1883